Saint Andrew is an administrative parish of Saint Vincent and the Grenadines, on the island of Saint Vincent. Its capital is Layou.

 Area: 29 km² (11 mi²)
 Population: 6,700 (2000 estimates)

Populated places
The following populated places are located in the parish of Saint Andrew:

 Camden Park
 Chauncey
 Clare Valley
 Dubois
 Edinboro
 Francois
 Liberty Lodge
 Montrose
 Pembroke
 Questelles
 Redemption
 Vermont

References

External links

 Parishes of Saint Vincent and the Grenadines, Statoids.com

Parishes of Saint Vincent and the Grenadines